Kłokocin is a district of Rybnik, Silesian Voivodeship, southern Poland. In the late 2013 it had about 2,550 inhabitants.

History 
The village was mentioned in a Latin document of Diocese of Wrocław called Liber fundationis episcopatus Vratislaviensis from around 1305 as item in Clocochina decima more polonico.

Politically it belonged initially to the Duchy of Racibórz, within feudally fragmentated Poland, ruled by a local branch of the Silesian Piast dynasty. In 1327 the Upper Silesian duchies became a fee of the Kingdom of Bohemia, which after 1526 became part of the Habsburg monarchy. After Silesian Wars it became a part of the Kingdom of Prussia.

After World War I in the Upper Silesia plebiscite 259 out of 281 voters in Kłokocin voted in favour of joining Poland, against 22 opting for staying in Germany. In 1922 it became a part of Silesian Voivodeship, Second Polish Republic. They were then annexed by Nazi Germany at the beginning of World War II. After the war it was restored to Poland.

In years 1945-1954 it was a part of gmina Boguszowice, in 1962 it was absorbed by the town Boguszowice and as part of it, was on May 27, 1975 amalgamated with Rybnik.

References

Districts of Rybnik